The 2013–14 Championnat National season was the 16th season since its establishment. The previous season's champions were Créteil. The season began on 9 August and ended on 23 May 2013. In the end of the season, Orléans, Luzenac and Gazélec Ajaccio were promoted to Ligue 2.

Teams

DNCG rulings
The DNCG ruled that Le Mans FC, who was relegated in 2012–13 Ligue 2, was relegated to the Division Honneur due to financial reasons.  FC Rouen, who ended as 5th on the 2012–13 Championnat National, was relegated to the Division Honneur due to the club accounting and its debts. Also, CS Sedan Ardennes, who was relegated in 2012–13 Ligue 2, was relegated to the Championnat de France amateur 2 due to its judiciary liquidation.

The teams were replaced by FC Bourg-Péronnas who ended the 15th position, ES Uzès Pont du Gard (16th) and Paris FC (17th). The three teams were supposed to be relegated in the 2012–13 Championnat National, as it had plans to change its number to 18 teams in this division.

Stadia and locations

Managerial changes

League table

Results

Top goalscorers

Source: Official Goalscorers' Standings

References

External links 
 

2013-14
3
Fra